Three Rock Cove is a local service district and designated place in the Canadian province of Newfoundland and Labrador. It is northwest of Stephenville.

History 
Three Rock Cove was originally known as Trois Cailloux, named for the three large rocks located just off of the shore.  Due to erosion two rocks are reduced in size and the last has been reduced to a stub that can only be seen at low tide.

Geography 
Three Rock Cove is in Newfoundland within Subdivision E of Division No. 4.

Demographics 

Government 
Three Rock Cove is a local service district (LSD) that is governed by a committee responsible for the provision of certain services to the community. The chair of the LSD committee is Maureen Dennis.

See also 
List of communities in Newfoundland and Labrador
List of designated places in Newfoundland and Labrador
List of local service districts in Newfoundland and Labrador

References

External links 

Populated coastal places in Canada
Designated places in Newfoundland and Labrador
Local service districts in Newfoundland and Labrador